Malakal Island ("Ngemelachel" in Palauan) is an island in the state of Koror, Palau. It is located at 134.45, 7.330278.

One of the tribes in Survivor: Micronesia was named Malakal.

Malakal Island is the site of Koror's port, as well as the radio station T8AA-AM.

Islands of Palau
Koror

Population 
The population was recorded around 1,500 people in the 2020 census. All of the population is considered urban.